Le Laboureur may refer to:

People with the surname
Claude Le Laboureur (1601–1680s), French Roman Catholic clergyman and historian
Jean Le Laboureur (1621–1675), French courtier, Roman Catholic clergyman and historian
Louis Le Laboureur (1615–1679), French poet